The following shipwrecks in Monroe County, Florida were added to the National Register of Historic Places as part of the 1733 Spanish Plate Fleet Shipwrecks Multiple Property Submission (or MPS).

Gallery

References

Spanish Plate Fleet Shipwrecks
Shipwrecks of the Florida Keys
Shipwrecks on the National Register of Historic Places in Florida
National Register of Historic Places Multiple Property Submissions in Florida
Spanish plate